is a Japanese manufacturer of paper products. In 2012 the company was the third largest company in the global forest, paper and packaging industry.
The company's stock is listed on the Tokyo Stock Exchange and the stock is constituent of the Nikkei 225 stock index.

Operations 
Oji Paper produces paper for printing, writing, and packaging. It also manufactures containers made from paper products, chemicals used in the production of paper and paper packaging equipment.

The company has 86 production sites throughout Japan, and forestry operations in Australia, Brazil, Canada, China, Germany, New Zealand and other countries worldwide.

History 
Mills were established in 1875 in the village of Ōji, at the time a suburb of Tokyo, and in 1889 in Shizuoka. In 1893 Shibusawa renamed the company Oji Paper after the location of its first mill. William Anderson went to Japan to oversee the erection of the paper mill in 1871.

In 1933, Oji Paper merged with Fuji Paper and Karafuto Industries, developing into an oligopolistic corporation that produced 80 percent of Japan's Western-style paper.

Following World War II, in order to prevent anti-competitive activities caused by overconcentration, the Excess Economic Powers Decentralization Act was implemented, breaking up the company into three components: Tomakomai Paper, Jujo Paper, and Honshu Paper.

Tomakomai Paper began as a one-plant operation, but upon its expansion into Kasugai, Aichi in 1952, the company was renamed Oji Paper Industries, and in 1960, it was renamed Oji Paper again. Oji Paper expanded its business through acquiring competitors including Kita Nippon Paper, Nippon Pulp Industries, and Toyo Pulp.

In 1993, Oji Paper merged with Kanzaki Paper to become New Oji Paper, and furthermore, in 1996, New Oji Paper and Honshu Paper merged again to become Oji Paper.

In 2012 Oji Paper transferred to a pure holding company system and started anew under the trade name Oji Holdings Corporation.

See also
 Oji Eagles
 Pulp and paper industry
 Ginjiro Fujiwara

References

External links
 Official website 

Manufacturing companies based in Tokyo
Pulp and paper companies of Japan
Companies listed on the Tokyo Stock Exchange
Mitsui
Japanese companies established in 1873
Holding companies based in Tokyo
Japanese brands
Holding companies established in 1873